Edmund David Lyon (1825–1891) was a British photographer and served in British Army. He photographed in more than 100 archeological sites in India.

Photography
Later he extensively took photographs in southern India and opened his studio in Ootakamund in 1865. He was commissioned by Madras Government and Bombay Government (both British) to take photographs of Archeological sites during 1867–69.  In 1871, he published a book with title 'Notes to Accompany a Series of Photographs Designed to Illustrate the Ancient Architecture of Western India' which contained numerous photographs of archeological sites as well as social life of 19th century India. He also considered himself as commercial photographer after retirement. He was appointed as general photographer for Madras Presidency in November 1867 and from November 1867 to August 1868, he toured Trichinopoly, Madurai, Tanjore, Halebid, Bellary and Vijayanagara Hampi exclusively to take photographs of temples and archeological sites. He produced more than 300 photographs of ancient monuments, temples at the request of Madras and Bombay presidencies of British Raj. He has also produced land scape photographs of Coonoor. His photographic works were displayed at Photographic Society of London in 1869 and they were well received.

Use of reflectors
Some of the corridors of ancient temples in South India are 700 feet long and to capture details of such monuments, Lyon created banks of reflectors.

Author
Edmund David Lyon wrote two novels, The Signora (1883) and Ireland's dream : a romance of the future (1888) apart from producing books on photography.

Collections
Lyon's work is represented in the permanent collections of the Getty Museum, the Victoria and Albert Museum, the British Library Collection, the Museum of Photographic Arts, among others.

Gallery

References

1825 births
1891 deaths